William Wingfield may refer to:

William Wingfield (MP) (1772–1858), English lawyer and MP for Bodmin
William Wingfield (14th century MP), for Suffolk (UK Parliament constituency)
William Wingfield (MP for Stafford), see Stafford (UK Parliament constituency)
William Wingfield (cricketer, born 1834) (1834–1913), English cricketer and clergyman
William Wingfield (Surrey cricketer) (1857–1938), English cricketer
William Pete Wingfield (born 1948), English record producer, performer and singer